Marlin Kikeba Piana (born 17 July 1982) is a former Congolese footballer.

Career
Piana began his career in France for Troyes AC in Ligue 1.

He was part of the Congolese 2004 African Nations Cup team, who finished bottom of their group in the first round of competition, thus failing to secure qualification for the quarter-finals.

In February 2007, he was on trial at English Football League One side Leyton Orient.

In July 2009, Piana joined Northern Premier League side Ashton United but suffered a knee injury that ruled him out for the majority of the season. He left the club in September 2010.

He later returned to Ashton United for a second spell.

References

External links
 
 
 
 
 

1982 births
Living people
Footballers from Kinshasa
Democratic Republic of the Congo footballers
Democratic Republic of the Congo international footballers
2004 African Cup of Nations players
ES Troyes AC players
ASC Oțelul Galați players
Sint-Truidense V.V. players
Clermont Foot players
Hapoel Ironi Kiryat Shmona F.C. players
Ashton United F.C. players
Congleton Town F.C. players
Ligue 1 players
Liga I players
Belgian Pro League players
Expatriate footballers in France
Expatriate footballers in Belgium
Expatriate footballers in Israel
Expatriate footballers in England
Northern Premier League players
Democratic Republic of the Congo expatriate footballers
Expatriate footballers in Romania
Democratic Republic of the Congo expatriate sportspeople in Romania
Association football forwards
21st-century Democratic Republic of the Congo people
Prescot Cables F.C. players